Hansjörg Aemisegger (born 18 February 1952) is a Swiss former racing cyclist. He was the Swiss National Road Race champion in 1979. He also rode in the men's road race at the 1976 Summer Olympics.

References

External links
 

1952 births
Living people
Swiss male cyclists
People from Winterthur
Olympic cyclists of Switzerland
Cyclists at the 1976 Summer Olympics
Sportspeople from the canton of Zürich